Quintus Pedius (died about 13) was a Roman painter and the first deaf person in recorded history known by name. He is the first recorded deaf painter and his education is the first recorded education of a deaf child. All that is known about him today is contained in a single passage of the Natural History by the Roman author  Pliny the Elder.

Pedius was the son of Roman Senator and orator Quintus Pedius Publicola. Pedius' paternal grandfather was the consul Quintus Pedius and his paternal grandmother was Valeria, a sister of Roman Senator and orator Marcus Valerius Messalla Corvinus. His paternal grandfather Pedius and Roman emperor Augustus were maternal second cousins (or first cousins once removed if Pedius was the son of Julia Major instead). Pedius was born deaf. On the advice of his paternal great-uncle Corvinus, and with permission from Augustus, Pedius was taught to paint. The boy turned out to be a talented painter, but died in his youth.

Footnotes

Sources

Oxford Handbook of Deaf Studies, Language, and Education
Dictionary of Greek and Roman Biography
Historical Facts about Deaf People - SignGenius.com

External links
Woodcut representing Quintus Pedius

13 deaths
1st-century Romans
Ancient Roman painters
Deaf artists
Year of birth unknown
Pedii
Italian deaf people
1st-century painters
Mute people